Carne de Ávila (Beef from Avila) is a protected geographic designation for beef originating from the Province of Ávila in Spain. The designation was approved in 1988.

Overview
Carne de Ávila is produced exclusively from livestock of the Avileña-Black Iberian breed found throughout the region of Castile and León. The regulatory board is headquartered in the city of Ávila.

The Avileña-Black Iberian breed is an evolved specimen from the serrana race, crossed with other breeds of the region, which has resulted in a small population of animals of uniform black coat, although some individuals exhibit degradations on the skin tone.

Carne de Ávila is the source of the original raw t-bone, a typical dish of the Province of Ávila.

See also
 List of beef dishes

References

External links 

http://www.origenespana.es/socios/carne-de-avila/
http://www.magrama.gob.es/imagenes/eu/Pliego_de_Condiciones_IGP_Carne_de_%C3%81vila_tcm7-141852_tcm9-309357.pdf
Recipe: http://www.acueducto2.com/how-to-cook-a-avila-ribeye/15332

 
Spanish cuisine
Beef dishes
Products with protected designation of origin